Steve O'Neal (born February 4, 1946 in Hearne, Texas) is a former American football punter and a wide receiver. O'Neal is best known for kicking a 98-yard punt during the American Football League game between the New York Jets and the Denver Broncos on September 21, 1969. This punt set the record for the longest punt in American Football League and professional football history. He finished his career with 337 punts for 13,725 yards and a 40.7 yards per punt average.

Professional football career
O'Neal was drafted in the 13th round, pick 21 of the 1969 Common Draft by the AFL's New York Jets.  O'Neal was traded by the Jets to the New Orleans Saints before the 1973 season along with backup quarterback Bob Davis in exchange for wide receiver Margene Adkins and punter Julian Fagan.  Jets' coach Weeb Ewbank said of the trade that "We've been disappointed with our punting game which is the reason for this trade," although Fagan only lasted one year with the Jets. He set a career-high with 81 punts in his final season for the New Orleans Saints in 1973.   After struggling during the 1974 preseason, he was waived by the Saints before the 1974 regular season began and replaced by Donnie Gibbs, who himself was waived after the first regular season game and replaced by Tom Blanchard.

See also
List of American Football League players

References

1946 births
Living people
People from Hearne, Texas
American football punters
American football wide receivers
Texas A&M Aggies football players
New York Jets players
New Orleans Saints players
American Football League players
People from Bryan, Texas